St. Vitus is a German bitters, which contains 44% ABV. It is sold in 20 ml bottles. It is Aldi's private label equivalent to the more expensive Underberg. St. Vitus is bought in packages containing four bottles (commonly referred to as a "battery") each and retails for €0.99 (US$1.06) in Germany and €2.10 (US$2.70) in Denmark.

St. Vitus is produced by St. Vitus Deutsche Edelliköre GMBH, Rottenburg an der Laaber.

St. Vitus and drinking games
In Denmark, it is popular to use several bottles in a drinking game. A version is to 'draw a number' – meaning that each participant gets a bottle of St. Vitus. A punishment is discussed and agreed upon between the participants, and each one then reads the small number at the bottom of the bottle. The participant with the lowest number will then be exposed to a punishment. The punishment can vary from drinking a number of St. Vitus simultaneously, being humiliated by the other participants.

Another popular tradition among some of the Danish population is to gather around, remove the obligatory spiritus sticker that marks all liquors sold in Denmark, then call out "spiritus" in a singing voice*, remove the bottle-cab, call out "Don Vitus" in the same singing voice and drink down the bottle in one draft. If an individual is not able to down the entire drink, or shakes violently afterwards is then usually made fun of by the others. This tradition is mostly seen in the heavy metal scene and it is believed to have its origins in those circles.

note: It is important to attach the spiritus sticker to any object in reach while singing out "spiritus".

Bitters
German cuisine
German alcoholic drinks